Lowrance is a manufacturer of consumer sonar and GPS receivers, as well as digital mapping systems. Headquartered in Tulsa, Oklahoma, with production facilities in Ensenada, Mexico, Lowrance employs approximately 1,000 people. The company is best known for its High Definition Systems (HDS) and add-on performance modules which include Broadband 4G Radar, StructureScan with SideScan and DownScan Imaging, Sonic Hub Audio, Sirius LWX-1 Weather, and NAIS Collision Avoidance.

In 2006, Simrad Yachting and Lowrance merged in a deal valued at $215 million, creating a new company named Navico. The Lowrance brand is wholly owned by Navico, Inc. A privately held, international corporation, Navico is currently the world’s largest marine electronics company, and is the parent company to leading marine electronics brands: Lowrance, Simrad Yachting and B&G. Navico has approximately 1,500 employees globally and distribution in more than 100 countries worldwide.

History
Lowrance, a designer and manufacturer of Sonar, GPS and Aviation instruments, was founded in Tulsa,Oklahoma  in 1957. In 2006, Lowrance was purchased by Simrad Yachting for $215 million. This merger went on to create Navico, now the largest leisure marine electronics manufacturer in the world.

See also 
 Navico, parent company of Simrad
 B&G, another subsidiary of Navico, which focuses on the sailing market
 Simrad Yachting, another subsidiary of Navico

References

External links
Official site

Navigation system companies
Marine electronics
Manufacturing companies based in Oklahoma
Companies based in Tulsa, Oklahoma
Electronics companies established in 1957